Bexley railway station is in the London Borough of Bexley in south-east London, in Travelcard Zone 6. The station, and all trains serving it, is operated by Southeastern.

Trains from the station run eastbound to Dartford, Gravesend and to London Cannon Street via Slade Green, and westbound to Cannon Street and London Charing Cross via Lewisham.

It was the scene of the Bexley derailment in 1997 when a freight train derailed very near the station.

History

Bexley station was opened in September 1866. It had five sidings on the down side, to the west of the station building with a row of coal stacks. Farm produce formed much of the goods traffic in the station's early years, much of it grown in local fields. The station had an SER-designed two-storey timber signal box which came into use about twenty years after the station opened. In 1955 the platforms were extended to accommodate ten carriage trains. The goods sidings closed in 1963 and the signal box closed in 1970. The clapboard buildings of the original station are well preserved.

The station will have a new footbridge and lifts added during 2023

Bexley derailment
The Bexley derailment was an accident which occurred on 4 February 1997 when an eastbound EWS freight train derailed near to Bexley station on the Dartford Loop Line.
Railtrack plc, SEIMCL and STRCL were each convicted of various offences under section 3 of the Health and Safety at Work etc. Act 1974 resulting in fines totalling £150,000 and £41,768. In his sentencing remarks, the judge said that it "was merciful that nobody was killed although four people were injured". The Inspectorate report describes it as "fortunate" that nobody was killed.
The primary cause of the accident was found to be very poor track maintenance, contributed to by an overloaded wagon.

Location

Bexley station is at the heart of Bexley Town centre (known as Bexley Village).

Facilities

A subway links the two platforms. The station has ticket gates. There is a 259-space car park.

Services

The typical off-peak service in trains per hour is:

The station is also served by a single peak hour return service between Dartford and London Blackfriars.

Connections
London Buses routes 132 and 229 and night route N21 serve the station.

References

External links

Railway stations in the London Borough of Bexley
Former South Eastern Railway (UK) stations
Railway stations in Great Britain opened in 1866
Railway stations served by Southeastern
1866 establishments in England